Pareiorhaphis togoroi is a species of catfish in the family Loricariidae. It is native to South America, where it occurs in the upper Paraná River basin in the Mantiqueira Mountains in the state of Minas Gerais in Brazil. The species reaches at least 6.7 cm (2.6 inches) in standard length. It was described in 2019 by Jose Carlos de Oliveira (of the Federal University of Juiz de Fora) and Osvaldo Takeshi Oyakawa (of the University of São Paulo) alongside the species Harttia intermontana and Neoplecostomus pirangaensis. FishBase does not yet list this species.

References 

Freshwater fish of Brazil
Fish described in 2019
Loricariidae
Catfish of South America